Gerry Vlak (born 25 March 1996) is a Dutch footballer who plays as a midfielder for IJsselmeervogels in the Dutch Tweede Divisie.

Career
Vlak moved to IJsselmeervogels from childhood club FC Volendam on a one-year contract in the summer of 2020, after reaching a deal with the club six months prior.

Personal life
His younger brother Jari Vlak is also a footballer.

References

External links
 Voetbal International profile 
 

1996 births
Living people
Dutch footballers
FC Volendam players
IJsselmeervogels players
Eerste Divisie players
Tweede Divisie players
Derde Divisie players
People from Volendam
Association football midfielders
Footballers from North Holland